Leșu may refer to:

 Leșu, a commune in Bistriţa-Năsăud County, Romania
 Leșu, a tributary of the Iad in Bihor County, Romania
 Leșu (Ilva), a tributary of the Ilva in Romania
 Leșu, a tributary of the Bistrița in Romania
 Lake Leșu in Bihor County, Romania
 Leșu Ursului mine, a large mine in the east of Romania in Suceava County close to Broșteni

See also 
 Leșile (disambiguation)